Pedro Rómoli (born 16 July 1971) is a retired Argentine footballer who played as a goalkeeper.

Club career
Rómoli previously played for Huracán and Lanús in the Primera División Argentina. In January 2002, he joined Granada of the Spanish Segunda División B. Granada re-signed Rómoli in July 2002.

References

External links
 

1971 births
Living people
Argentine footballers
Club Atlético Huracán footballers
Club Atlético Lanús footballers
Granada CF footballers
Motril CF players
People from Caseros Department
Huracán de Tres Arroyos footballers
Argentine Primera División players
Association football goalkeepers
Sportspeople from Santa Fe Province